Cullen is an unincorporated community in Union County, Kentucky, United States.

A post office in the community was established in 1885, and named for the first postmaster Joseph Cullen. That post office closed in 1906.

References

Unincorporated communities in Union County, Kentucky
Unincorporated communities in Kentucky